Donald Robert Macgregor (1824 – 9 December 1889) was a Scottish politician. From 1874 to 1878 he was a Member of Parliament (MP) for the Leith Burghs constituency, near Edinburgh.

He was born in Perth and later moved to Leith where he lived at 13 Bernard Street as an insurance agent.

He later became a merchant and steamship owner in Leith.

He was Colonel of the Leith Volunteer Corps, 1st Midlothian Rifles, in succession to Col. Henry Arnaud HEICS.

Family

He was married to Mary Anderson.

References

External links 
 

1824 births
1889 deaths
Members of the Parliament of the United Kingdom for Edinburgh constituencies
UK MPs 1874–1880
Scottish Liberal Party MPs